The NBC Sunday Night Movie was a weekly film block which ran on NBC on Sunday nights from 9 to 11pm or 8:30pm until 11pm. Often for miniseries programming, it would air the first night of the series, with the second night as part of the NBC Monday Night Movie.

The last film to air was Friday Night Lights on September 6, 2009 with 2.6 million viewers.  During the mid-1980s the Sunday Night Movie was aired consistently enough to be ranked in the top 30 highest-rated programs for 1985–1988.

Between 1976 and 1981, the Sunday Night Movie was re-titled as The Big Event; though it continued to be made up of mostly films, at that time it was also a block for specials and made-for-TV sporting events. replaced by an umbrella program, The Big Event. Although much of the Big Events run featured film premieres, made for TV movies and installments of miniseries, some were specials and sports events.

References 

1981 American television series debuts
1980s American anthology television series
1990s American anthology television series
2000s American anthology television series
English-language television shows
American motion picture television series
NBC original programming
American television films
American film series